Raymond Percival Brookes, Baron Brookes (10 April 1909 – 31 July 2002) was a British industrialist.

Brookes became the Managing Director of GKN in 1964 and the group's Chairman and Chief Executive in 1965. He retired in 1974 and was made GKN's Life President.

Brookes was knighted in 1971. On 14 January 1976, he was created a life peer, as Baron Brookes, of West Bromwich in the County of West Midlands. He sat as a Conservative until 1990, when he left the Conservative Party in protest against the removal of Margaret Thatcher. He then sat as a crossbencher.

Coat of arms

References 

1909 births
2002 deaths
Knights Bachelor
British industrialists
Crossbench life peers
Life peers created by Elizabeth II